Decoradrillia interstincta is a species of sea snail, a marine gastropod mollusc in the family Drilliidae.

Description

Distribution
This species occurs in the shallow waters of the Caribbean Sea off Honduras.

References

 Fallon P.J. (2016). Taxonomic review of tropical western Atlantic shallow water Drilliidae (Mollusca: Gastropoda: Conoidea) including descriptions of 100 new species. Zootaxa. 4090(1): 1–363

External links

interstincta
Gastropods described in 2016